"Hard Rock Hallelujah" is a song by Finnish hard rock band Lordi. It was released as a single in 2006, reaching the  1 spot in Finland and reaching the top 10 in eight other European countries. In the United Kingdom, the song peaked at No. 25.

It was voted as the most popular Finnish Eurovision entry in the 40 years the country had participated. It held the record for most points until it was beaten by "Fairytale" by Alexander Rybak of Norway with 387 points three years later.

On 26 May 2006, Lordi broke a world record for karaoke songs, when about 80,000 people sang "Hard Rock Hallelujah" on Helsinki's Market Square.

Eurovision Song Contest
As Finland had not qualified for the final in their previous attempts, the song was performed in the semi-final. Here, it was performed sixteenth, following 's Tina Karol with "Show Me Your Love" and preceding the ' Treble with "Amambanda". At the close of voting, it had received 292 points, placing first in the 23-strong field and qualifying for the final.

In the final, it was performed seventeenth, following 's Anna Vissi with "Everything" and preceding the Ukrainian entry. Having led the voting for most of the telecast, it ultimately received 292 points again, winning the competition, breaking the previous record (held by Ruslana with "Wild Dances") for the highest points tally in contest history as well as achieving the unusual feat of emulating its semi-final performance exactly.

Commentators were generally positive about the band and the song, with even the notoriously acerbic Terry Wogan seeing it as something of a good thing for the contest (although he sarcastically compared Mr Lordi to Roy Wood).

It was the second Eurovision song with the word "hallelujah" in its title, the first one being Israel's "Hallelujah", which also got first place at the Eurovision Song Contest 1979.

Performance
The semifinal and final performances of "Hard Rock Hallelujah" at the 2006 Eurovision Song Contest were similar; the lead singer, Mr Lordi, stated before the final that the only planned changes were that "We'll scream louder. And turn the amps up." The performance took place on a fairly bare Eurovision stage, with banks of video monitors in the back displaying abstract images of fire, and the band in their usual monster costumes.

The band brought a hat including the flag of Finland to the performance, worn by Mr Lordi in the actual performance and by Amen during the encore after the winning. For the final performances Mr Lordi also used two official stage props from Lordi's live concerts: a two-headed battle axe and bat-like wings. During the whole performance, the band members remained relatively stationary, with the exception of guitarist Amen, who hopped back and forth energetically.

The song had frequent use of pyrotechnics, starting with flames bursting from the stage during the song's introduction, and bursts of sparks, particularly during the chorus. The final chorus of the song had an extended pyrotechnic display, with the whole stage covered in sparks, including jets shooting from the ends of Amen's guitar and Ox's bass as they were being played, and from the two-headed axe that Mr Lordi held up above his head.

The encore performance after they were announced the winners was much simpler, as the pyrotechnics were obviously not available and Mr Lordi's wings did not unfurl.

On 26 May 2006 the Guinness World Record of karaoke singing was broken when approximately 80,000 people gathered to sing "Hard Rock Hallelujah" in Helsinki, Finland, to celebrate victory in Eurovision.

Single release
The song peaked at No. 1 in the Finland singles chart upon its release and in addition, released as a physical single during the week starting on 5 June 2006 in the United Kingdom, via the BMG label. Download sales for the previous week were therefore eligible to be counted for the 4 June 2006 UK Singles Chart, which led to the single to chart at No. 59. It made a small but significant impact in the Top 40, peaking at No. 25 in the 11 June 2006 chart as the band's only single so far to ever be released in that country.

Music videos

The video starts with a shy female hard rock fan walking through the corridors of a school, singing softly along to the song playing on her headset. She reaches an entrance to the gym, where she stands watching the cheerleaders practice. Suddenly, the lights flicker and go out, and a wind starts to blow. As the chorus starts to play, the doors to the gym are blown off of their hinges by Mr Lordi, who enters and crushes the now-screaming cheerleaders with a wave of his hands killing them. There is a fiery flash, and the entire band appears in the centre of the gym, playing the song.

The fan is terrified, but approaches Mr Lordi as he points to her, singing "... you will see the jokers soon'll be the new kings". He raises the dead cheerleaders as zombies, and they stand around the fan pumping their fists in the air along with the music. The end of the video shows the fan, now confident and unafraid, leading the zombies through the school halls as students run away. She stops and punches the air with her fist as the zombies rush around her towards a group of students who are trapped by the closed main doors.

The video was directed by Pete Riski. The fan is played by Leina Ogihara.

Another version was filmed specially for the Eurovision Song Contest 2007 opening, directed by Antti J. Jokinen. Video starts with titles: "Arctic Circle, Finland, Rovaniemi". A troll runs through the Arctic landscape obviously showing signs of a bad limp in one of his legs. As the Troll reaches a frozen lake, it sudden shatters in a straight line behind him and as vast chunks of ice fall around him the troll changes into a wolf to pick up speed and escape death. Meanwhile, Mr Lordi and the band play in a hut at the deep dark forest and then they set the woods on fire with the flame forming lines that become Lordi's symbol—the monster mask. The Troll changes back to his previous form once he reaches the entrance of the dark forest as night begins to fall. The troll is next seen arriving at a small village filled with orcish creatures in the dead night and as he walks down a path leading out of the village, the troll comes across a huge hut made from a tree. Entering the hut the Troll comes face to face with Mr Lordi who seems to be the chief of the other creatures and as the band continues to play a whirlwind of flames surround them all. Mr Lordi then unleashes his demonic wings and seemingly burns the troll by manipulating the flames, As the fire fades away Mr Lordi and the rest of band are seen at a concert in Finland surrounded by their fans who sing the final chorus of the song along with them.

Track listings

Finnish CD single
 "Hard Rock Hallelujah" (Eurovicious radio edit) – 3:01
 "Hard Rock Hallelujah" (full album version) – 4:07
 "Mr. Killjoy" – 3:24

European CD single
 "Hard Rock Hallelujah" (Eurovicious radio edit) – 3:01
 "Mr. Killjoy" – 3:24

German CD single
 "Hard Rock Hallelujah" (Eurovicious radio edit) – 3:01
 "Supermonstars" (album version) – 4:04

German DualDisc CD single

CD side
 "Hard Rock Hallelujah" (Eurovicious radio edit)
 "Hard Rock Hallelujah" (full album version)
 "Mr. Killjoy"

DVD side
 "Hard Rock Hallelujah" (video)
 "Blood Red Sandman" (video)
 "Devil Is a Loser" (video)

Charts and certifications

Weekly charts

Year-end charts

Certifications

References

2006 singles
2006 songs
English-language Finnish songs
Eurovision Song Contest winning songs
Eurovision songs of 2006
Eurovision songs of Finland
Finnish rock songs
Lordi songs
Number-one singles in Finland
RCA Records singles
Sony BMG singles